Nigel Pulsford (born 11 April 1961) is a British musician, and the original guitarist of the alternative rock band Bush.

Early life
Pulsford was born in 1961 in Newport, Monmouthshire, and grew up with two sisters, Angela and Jan. (Angela would later play violin on certain Bush songs, as well as on one of Cyndi Lauper's albums.)

Pulsford attended Fairfax Academy in Sutton Coldfield and the University of Bradford in Bradford, West Yorkshire before dropping out with the intent of playing in a rock band.

Music career

Pre-Bush (1979–1992) 
In 1979, aged 18, Pulsford was involved in various bands with friend Neil Crossley. Performing in pubs and bars in Lancaster, the groups played rhythm and blues, power pop, and what Pulsford termed "fake jazz".

In the 1980s, Pulsford joined a female-fronted funk band called Taming The Outback. Influenced by James White and the Blacks, Pulsford didn't enjoy his tenure in the band, but remained a member for over a year because of a relationship with the group's manager.

Puslford took a year of from music in the mid-1980s, which he stated in 1999 was due to being "fed up with being in crap bands". In 1987, Pulsford formed a group called The Charms, who performed a single concert in High Wycombe supporting Thee Hypnotics. Shortly thereafter, Pulsford joined the band King Blank, who released two studio albums, The Real Dirt (1988) and King Blank to the Ian Lowery Group (1989). After a 1990 promotional tour of the United States, inclusive of a performance at CBGB, New York, King Blank had dissolved by 1991.

Bush (1992–2002) 
In 1992, Pulsford met Gavin Rossdale in a London club and they discovered a mutual appreciation for several musical groups and artists. They formed a band called Future Primitive and were joined by bassist Dave Parsons and drummer Robin Goodridge and managed by Joe Oliver. Shortly thereafter the band was renamed Bush. Pulsford was the band's lead guitarist.

Bush released their debut album, Sixteen Stone, in 1994. The album went six times platinum, riding the strength of the grunge movement and such hit singles as "Comedown," "Glycerine," "Machinehead," "Little Things," and "Everything Zen."  They achieved further success with three more albums and hit singles such as "Swallowed," "Greedy Fly," "The Chemicals Between Us," "Letting the Cables Sleep," and "The People That We Love."

Pulsford released a solo album in 1999 entitled Heavenly Toast on the Paradise Road. All material on the album was written by Pulsford.

In 2002, after the release of the album Golden State, Pulsford took a break from touring with the band while his wife was pregnant. He was replaced by Chris Traynor temporarily and his future in the band became the subject of much speculation among fans. Rossdale later confirmed that he intended to make the next Bush album with Traynor and said that Pulsford had quit the band.

Despite Rossdale affirming that he wanted to continue Bush with Traynor, the band went on an indefinite hiatus following the end of the "Golden State" tour. Rossdale later formed Institute with Traynor. Backtracking on his previous assertion that Bush could continue without Pulsford, Rossdale stated that he started a new band because he didn't want to dilute everything Bush had accomplished by changing members.

After Bush
Since the breakup of Bush, Pulsford has spent time with his family. However, he has remained musically active recording in his home studio and producing other artists' work. In 2008 he was working with British alternative rock group Furlined as a producer and occasional guitarist. Pulsford also worked with singer Emma Holland on her second album, and in 2012 produced the debut album by London singer/songwriter Dave Giles, entitled "Love, Life, Loss And Tea", released on 28 October 2012. In addition to working with other artists, Pulsford has expressed his intent to release another solo album.

Bush Reformation
In June 2010 Bush's return was announced and Chris Traynor, who had played with Gavin Rossdale since Bush ended, was installed as the band's new lead guitarist. Pulsford was joined by bassist Dave Parsons in turning down the opportunity to rejoin the band.

Personal life
Nigel Pulsford married his wife Judith Rose on 20 July 1996. He has three children. They currently live in Bath, UK.

Discography

Solo 
 Heavenly Toast on the Paradise Road (1999)

With King Blank 
 The Real Dirt (1988)
 King Blank to the Ian Lowery Group (1989)

With Bush 
 Sixteen Stone (1994)
 Razorblade Suitcase (1996)
 The Science of Things (1999)
 Golden State (2001)

References

External links
 Bush Fansite

1961 births
British rock guitarists
British male guitarists
Bush (British band) members
Living people
People from Newport, Wales